1905 Ambartsumian, provisional designation , is an asteroid from the inner regions of the asteroid belt, approximately 8 kilometers in diameter. It was discovered on 14 May 1972, by Russian astronomer Tamara Smirnova at the Crimean Astrophysical Observatory, Nauchnyj, on the Crimean peninsula. The asteroid was named after theoretical astrophysicist Victor Ambartsumian.

Orbit and classification 

Ambartsumian orbits the Sun in the inner main-belt at a distance of 1.9–2.6 AU once every 3 years and 4 months (1,211 days). Its orbit has an eccentricity of 0.16 and an inclination of 3° with respect to the ecliptic.

Physical characteristics 

According to the survey carried out by NASA's Wide-field Infrared Survey Explorer with its subsequent NEOWISE mission, Ambartsumian measures 8.0 kilometers in diameter and its surface has an albedo of 0.23. When using a generic diameter-to-magnitude conversion, it has a diameter of 7–17 kilometers, based on an absolute magnitude of 12.8 and an albedo in the range of 0.05–0.25, which accounts for both the brighter stony as well as for the darker carbonaceous spectral types. As of 2017, Ambartsumians composition, rotation period and shape remain unknown.

Naming 

This minor planet was named after Soviet–Armenian theoretical astrophysicist Victor Ambartsumian (1908–1996), founder of the Soviet School for Astrophysics, president of the Academy of Sciences of the Armenian SSR, director of the Byurakan Observatory, and president of the IAU (1961–1964). The official  was published by the Minor Planet Center on 20 February 1976.

References

External links 
 Asteroid Lightcurve Database (LCDB), query form (info )
 Dictionary of Minor Planet Names, Google books
 Asteroids and comets rotation curves, CdR – Observatoire de Genève, Raoul Behrend
 Discovery Circumstances: Numbered Minor Planets (1)-(5000)  – Minor Planet Center
 
 

001905
Discoveries by Tamara Mikhaylovna Smirnova
Named minor planets
19720514